Golden Rocket may refer to:

 The Golden Rocket (song), a  Hank Snow song popular in 1951
 Golden Rocket (train), a proposed named passenger train of the Rock Island (CRIP) and Southern Pacific (SP) railroads
 The 1956 Oldsmobile Golden Rocket concept car, presented at the 1957 Paris Auto Show
 La Banda del Golden Rocket, a 1991 television series
 USS Zelima (AF-49), a ship called Golden Rocket during ordering